Chelis lafontainei is a moth of the family Erebidae. It was described by Douglas C. Ferguson in 1995. It is found in Canada's Northwest Territories.

This species was formerly a member of the genus Neoarctia, but was moved to Chelis along with the other species of the genera Holoarctia, Neoarctia, and Hyperborea.

References

 

Arctiina
Moths described in 1995